David "Dai" Thomas (15 February 1879 – 1958) was a Welsh professional rugby league footballer who played in the 1900s. He played at representative level for Other Nationalities, and at club level for Oldham (Heritage No. 74), as a forward (prior to the specialist positions of), during the era of contested scrums.

Playing career

International honours
David "Dai" Thomas won a cap, and scored his team's first try, playing as a forward, i.e. number 11, for Other Nationalities in the 9–3 victory over England at Central Park, Wigan on Tuesday 5 April 1904, in the first ever international rugby league match.

Championship appearances
Dai Thomas played in Oldham's victory in the Championship during the 1904–05 season.

References

External links
 (archived by web.archive.org) Statistics at orl-heritagetrust.org.uk
Representative Honours

1879 births
1958 deaths
Oldham R.L.F.C. players
Other Nationalities rugby league team players
Place of death missing
Rugby league forwards
Rugby league players from Swansea
Welsh rugby league players